Kiyika Tokodi  is a Congolese former footballer who played as a midfielder for Belgian club K.A.A. Gent between 1980 and 1986.

He represented the Zaire national team in international competition, appearing in a 1986 African Cup of Nations qualifying match versus the Republic of the Congo in Brazzaville, scoring a goal in a 5–2 victory. He also scored two goals, both from penalties, in a 5–2 victory over Mozambique in a 1982 World Cup qualifying match on 13 July 1980 in Kinshasa. In addition, he scored the winning goal in a 3–2 victory over Guinea in a 1980 African Cup of Nations qualifying match on 5 August 1979.

Career statistics

International goals
Scores and results list Zaire's goal tally first, score column indicates score after each Tokodi goal.

References

Living people
Democratic Republic of the Congo footballers
Association football midfielders
Democratic Republic of the Congo international footballers
Belgian Pro League players
K.A.A. Gent players
Democratic Republic of the Congo expatriate footballers
Democratic Republic of the Congo expatriate sportspeople in Belgium
Expatriate footballers in Belgium
Year of birth missing (living people)
21st-century Democratic Republic of the Congo people